Paper models, also called card models or papercraft, are models constructed mainly from sheets of heavy paper, paperboard, card stock, or foam.

Details 

This may be considered a broad category that contains origami and card modeling. Origami is the process of making a paper model by folding a single piece of paper without using glue or cutting while the variation kirigami does. Card modeling is making scale models from sheets of cardstock on which the parts were printed, usually in full color. These pieces would be cut out, folded, scored, and glued together. Papercraft is the art of combining these model types to build complex creations such as wearable suits of armor, life-size characters, and accurate weapon models.

Sometimes the model pieces can be punched out. More frequently the printed parts must be cut out. Edges may be scored to aid folding. The parts are usually glued together with polyvinyl acetate glue ("white glue", "PVA"). In this kind of modeling, the sections are usually pre-painted, so there is no need to paint the model after completion. Some enthusiasts may enhance the model by painting and detailing. Due to the nature of the paper medium, the model may be sealed with varnish or filled with spray foam to last longer. Some enthusiasts also use papercrafts or perdurable to do life-sized props starting by making the craft, covering it with resin and painting them. Some also use photo paper and laminate them by heat, thus preventing the printed side from color wearing out, beyond the improved realistic effect on certain kinds of models (ships, cars, buses, trains, etc.). Paper crafts can be used as references to do props with other materials too.

History 

The first paper models appeared in Europe in the 17th century with the earliest commercial models were appearing in French toy catalogs in 1800. Printed card became common in magazines in the early part of the 20th century. The popularity of card modeling boomed during World War II when the paper was one of the few items whose use and production was not heavily regulated.

Micromodels, designed and published in England from 1941 were very popular with 100 different models, including architecture, ships, and aircraft. But as plastic model kits became more commonly available, interest in paper decreased.

Availability 
The Robert Freidus Collection, held at the V&A Museum of Childhood has over 14000 card models exclusively in the category Architectural Paper Models. Since paper model patterns can be easily printed and assembled, the Internet has become a popular means of exchanging them. Commercial corporations have recently begun using downloadable paper models for their marketing (examples are Yamaha and Canon).

The availability of numerous models on the Internet at little or no cost, which can then be downloaded and printed on inexpensive inkjet printers has caused its popularity again to increase worldwide. Home printing also allows models to be scaled up or down easily (for example, in order to make two models from different authors, in different scales, match each other in size), although the paper weight might need to be adjusted in the same ratio.

Inexpensive kits are available from dedicated publishers (mostly based in Eastern Europe; examples include Halinski, JSC Models, and Maly Modelarz), a portion of the catalog of which date back to 1950.

Experienced hobbyists often scratchbuild models, either by first hand drawing or using software such as Adobe Illustrator and Inkscape. An historical example of highly specialized software is Designer Castles for BBC Micro and Acorn Archimedes platforms, which was developed as a tool for creation of card model castles. CAD and CG software, such as Rhino 3D, 3DS Max, Blender, and specialist software, like Pepakura Designer from Tama Software, or Dunreeb Cutout or Ultimate Papercraft 3D, may be employed to convert 3D computer models into two-dimensional printable templates for assembly.

3D models to paper  

The use of 3D models greatly assists in the construction of paper models, with video game models being the most prevalent source. The video game or source in question will have to be loaded into the computer. Various methods of extracting the model exist, including using a model viewer and exporting it into a workable file type, or capturing the model from the emulation directly. The methods of capturing the model are often unique to the subject and the tools available. Readability of file-formats including propriety ones could mean that a model viewer and exporter is unavailable outside of the developer. Using other tools that capture rendered 3D models and textures is often the only way to obtain them. In this case, the designer may have to arrange the textures and the wireframe model on a 3D program, such as SketchUp, 3DS MAX, Metasequoia, or Blender before exporting it to a papercraft creating program, such as Dunreeb Cutout or Pepakura Designer by Tama software. From there the model is typically refined to give a proper layout and construction tabs that will affect the overall appearance and difficulty in constructing the model.

Subjects

Because people can create their own patterns, paper models are limited only by their designers' imaginations and ability to manipulate paper into forms. Vehicles of all forms, from cars and cargo trucks to space shuttles, are a frequent subject of paper models, some using photo-realistic textures from their real-life counterparts for extremely fine details. Architecture models can be very simple and crude forms to very detailed models with thousands of pieces to assemble. The most prevalent designs are from video games, due to their popularity and ease of producing paper models.

On the Web, enthusiasts can find hundreds of models from different designers across a wide range of subjects. The models include very difficult and ambitious paper projects, such as life-sized and complex creations. Architectural paper models are popular with model railway enthusiasts.

Various models are used in tabletop gaming, primarily wargaming. Scale paper models allow for easy production of armies and buildings for use in gaming and that can be scaled up or down readily or produced as desired. Whether they be three-dimensional models or two-dimensional icons, players are able to personalize and modify the models to bear unique unit designations and insignias for gaming.

See also 
Net
Cardboard modeling
Paper Aeroplane
Origamic architecture
Superquick
Leo Monahan

References

External links

Software for creating paper models 

 Pepakura Designer
 Dunreeb Cutout
 Ultimate Papercraft 3D
 PaperMaker

Paper products
Scale modeling
Paper toys